Thelonious Monk with John Coltrane is a 1961 album by Thelonious Monk issued on Jazzland Records, a subsidiary of Riverside Records. It consists of material recorded four years earlier when Monk worked extensively with John Coltrane, issued after Coltrane had become a leader and jazz star in his own right.

The original LP was assembled by the label with material from three different sessions. The impetus for the album was the discovery of three usable studio tracks recorded by the Monk Quartet with Coltrane in July 1957 at the beginning of the band's six-month residency at New York's legendary Five Spot club near Cooper Square. To round out the release, producer Keepnews included two outtakes from the Monk's Music album recorded the previous month, and one additional outtake from Thelonious Himself recorded in April.

The original LP contained the first 6 tracks, and was reissued in 2000 on Fantasy Records as part of its series for back catalogue using the JVC 20-bit K2 coding system. The take of "Monk's Mood" from Thelonious Himself was added as a bonus track to the 2000 reissue. Because of the historical significance of this album it was inducted into the Grammy Hall of Fame in 2007. The album and musicians were referred to in code and used as the delivery method for the mission briefing in Mission: Impossible – Rogue Nation (2015).

Track listing
All selections by Thelonious Monk except as indicated.

Side one
 “Ruby, My Dear” – 6:17
 “Trinkle, Tinkle” – 6:37
 “Off Minor [take 4]” – 5:10

Side two
 “Nutty” – 6:35
 “Epistrophy” (Kenny Clarke, Monk) – 3:07
 “Functional [take 1]” – 9:46

CD Reissue 2010 bonus track
"Monk's Mood" – 7:52

Sessions 
Track 1, 2 and 4 recorded July, 1957.
Tracks 3 and 5 recorded June 25–26, 1957 (Monk's Music session outtakes)
Track 6 and 7 recorded April 16, 1957. (Thelonious Himself session outtake [6] and re-release [7])

Personnel 
 Thelonious Monk – piano
 John Coltrane – tenor saxophone, tracks 1–5, 7
 Ray Copeland – trumpet on "Off Minor" and "Epistrophy"
 Gigi Gryce – alto saxophone on "Off Minor" and "Epistrophy"
 Coleman Hawkins – tenor saxophone on "Off Minor" and "Epistrophy"
 Wilbur Ware – bass on all except for "Functional"
 Shadow Wilson – drums on "Ruby, My Dear", "Trinkle, Tinkle" and "Nutty"
 Art Blakey – drums on "Off Minor" and "Epistrophy"

References

1961 albums
Thelonious Monk albums
Albums produced by Orrin Keepnews
Riverside Records albums
John Coltrane albums
Collaborative albums